Typhloseiulus is a genus of mites in the Phytoseiidae family.

Species
 Typhloseiulus arzakanicus (Arutunjan, 1972)
 Typhloseiulus calabriae (Ragusa & Swirski, 1976)
 Typhloseiulus carmonae (Chant & Yoshida-Shaul, 1983)
 Typhloseiulus eleonorae (Ragusa & Swirski, 1981)
 Typhloseiulus eliahuswirskii (Ragusa Di Chiara, 1992)
 Typhloseiulus erymanthii (Papadoulis & Emmanouel, 1988)
 Typhloseiulus peculiaris (Kolodochka, 1980)
 Typhloseiulus rodopiensis (Papadoulis & Emmanouel, 1994)
 Typhloseiulus simplex (Chant, 1956)
 Typhloseiulus subsimplex (Arutunjan, 1972)

References

Phytoseiidae